The Cubby Bear is a sports bar, eatery, and music venue in Chicago, Illinois.

The Cubby Bear is located at Addison and Clark Streets across from Wrigley Field, home of the Chicago Cubs. It was established in 1953 and is formally known as the Cubs Pub and Cubs Grill. The bar has won a few awards including Best Rock Club by the Chicago Music Awards, #1 Neighborhood Bar in Chicago by Maxim magazine and even 7th best sports bar in the United States by Sports Illustrated. The restaurant includes private rooms that overlook Wrigley Field.  The management of the Cubby Bear also caters and organizes the booking of three buildings on Sheffield and Waveland which each have a Wrigley Roof.

Bands that have played at The Cubby Bear (which was big in punk rock early on) include 1982-Naked Raygun (from Chicago, attended by a young Dave Grohl), 1985-Gregg Allman Band, 1988-Pixies, Social Distortion, Die Kreuzen (from Milwaukee), and Soul Asylum. 1991-Johnny Winter, Spin Doctors, Screaming Trees, Etta James, Johnny Cash, Phish. 1992-No Doubt. 1993-Dave Matthews Band. 1995-War, B.B. King. 1996-Jerry Lee Lewis, Run DMC. 2000-Papa Roach, 2001-Chevelle (from Chicago), 2005-Debbie Gibson, 2006-Violent Femmes (from Milwaukee), Los Lobos. 2009-Trapt, Tonic, Cage the Elephant, Metric, Our Lady Peace. 2010-Saosin with Story of the Year, Fuel, My Life with the Thrill Kill Kult (from Chicago), Filter. 2011-Sick Puppies. 2012-Adam Ant, Vince Neil (Mötley Crüe lead singer), 2013-Umphrey's McGee (from Chicago), 2014-Kongos with Airborne Toxic Event, Foo Fighters, Bush, Local H (from Chicago). 2015-Awolnation, Smoking Popes (from Chicago). 2016-Walk the Moon, Alcohol Ignition Switch

Notes

External links
 

Music venues in Chicago
Nightclubs in Chicago
Restaurants in Chicago
Drinking establishments in Chicago
Chicago Cubs
Restaurants established in 1953
1953 establishments in Illinois